Clio is an unincorporated community in Roane County, West Virginia, United States.

References

Unincorporated communities in Roane County, West Virginia
Unincorporated communities in West Virginia